The 2004 Japanese Grand Prix (officially the 2004 Formula 1 Fuji Television Japanese Grand Prix) was a Formula One motor race held on 10 October 2004 at the Suzuka Circuit. It was Race 17 of 18 in the 2004 FIA Formula One World Championship.

Report

Background 
This was Jarno Trulli's first race with the Toyota team after missing the previous race. This was Olivier Panis's last race as he decided to retire from the race seat. But he stayed with the Toyota team, as the test driver.

Qualifying 
All the running on Saturday was cancelled due to Typhoon Ma-on, meaning that both the qualifying sessions were run on Sunday morning. The grid was shaken up due to rain, Ralf Schumacher and Mark Webber taking fortunate grid positions due to being allotted early running in the session.

Race 
While Michael Schumacher was not as competitive towards the end of the season as he had been en route to his seventh title, Japan could be seen as normal service resumed, the German winning comfortably from pole. This was his 13th and last win of the season, breaking his own record from 2002 with 11. Ralf was behind him, taking his first podium since breaking his back at Indianapolis. It was the last time the Schumacher brothers finished in 1–2 formation (having done so on four other occasions: 2001 Canadian Grand Prix, 2001 French Grand Prix, 2002 Brazilian Grand Prix, 2003 Canadian Grand Prix).

At Suzuka in 2003 BAR upset the form book with a double points finish – in 2004 this was commonplace, although 11 points was still their biggest haul of the season. Contact between David Coulthard and Rubens Barrichello ended the race for both drivers. This was Rubens Barrichello's only DNF of the season. Webber retired in bizarre circumstances – part of the seat had overheated, causing burns to his buttocks.

It was also the last 1-2 finish between German drivers until the 2013 Indian Grand Prix.

Friday drivers
The bottom 6 teams in the 2003 Constructors' Championship were entitled to run a third car in free practice on Friday. These drivers drove on Friday but did not compete in qualifying or the race.

Wirdheim and Briscoe could not got to drive any single lap Friday training sessions. Teams confirmed it as a reason for not driving the drivers that they had a limited number of tyres for very wet weather, and were therefore not sufficient for the cars of the third drivers.

Classification

Qualifying 
Qualifying was held on Sunday morning due to weather conditions on Saturday.

Race

 Baumgartner started the race from the pitlane.

Championship standings after the race 
Bold text indicates the World Champions.

Drivers' Championship standings

Constructors' Championship standings

Note: Only the top five positions are included for both sets of standings.

References

External links

Japanese Grand Prix
Japanese Grand Prix
Grand Prix
Japanese Grand Prix